Fegyvernek is a town in Jász-Nagykun-Szolnok County, in the Northern Great Plain region of central Hungary.

Geography

Population
It has a population of 6447 people (2015).

References

External links

  in Hungarian

Populated places in Jász-Nagykun-Szolnok County